Puyal is a 1952 Indian Tamil-language film directed by G. Viswanath. The film stars G. M. Basheer and M. V. Rajamma. It was released on 25 July 1952.

Plot

Cast 
List adapted from the database of Film News Anandan and from Thiraikalanjiyam.

Male cast
G. M. Basheer
A. K. Mohan
K. R. Ramsingh

Female cast
M. V. Rajamma
M. Rajee
R. Lakshmi Devi
S. Sakunthala
G. M. Gulzar

Production 
The film was produced by K. P. George under the banner Pelican Pictures and was directed by G. Viswanath who also did the editing. Story was written by C. J. Cherian while the dialogues were penned by Karmayogi Rajagopalan. G. P. Ramasamy and G. K. Ramu were in charge of cinematography. Art direction was by Kuttiyappu and Ponnusam and Choreography was done by C. Thangaraj. Still photography was by K. Anandan. The film was made at Central Studios.

Soundtrack 
Music was composed by S. G. K. Pillai and P. S. Diwakar while the lyrics were penned by Diwakar.

References

External links 

1950s Tamil-language films